Joe's Stone Crab, also known as Joe's Stone Crabs, is an American restaurant in Miami Beach, Florida. In 1998 the restaurant won an America’s Classic Award from the James Beard Foundation

Joe Weiss began his Miami Beach career by cooking at Smith's Casino beginning in 1913. On December 4, 1920, Joe officially opened his own restaurant at 213 Biscayne Avenue (later called Biscayne Street and now called South Pointe Drive), practically across the street from the restaurant he operated for Smith’s Casino. Joe's is the biggest buyer of Florida stone crab claws, and it plays a significant role in the industry, influencing the wholesale price and financing many crabbers.

Even though stone crabs are their most famous dish now, fish was served, rather than crabs, after the restaurant's opening. When an ichthyologist asked Weiss why he didn't serve stone crabs, he answered that no one would want to eat them. He was wrong, as they found out soon after first cooking them.

History

In 1913, "Hungarian-born Joe Weiss" arrived in Miami Beach from New York hoping to relieve his asthma.  Five years later, he opened up the "original Joe's Restaurant" in the front room of the bungalow he shared with his wife Jennie on Biscayne Street.  In 1921, an ichthyologist noticed the large number of stone crabs in the area and brought them to Joe to find out if they were edible.

In 1999, Lettuce Entertain You Enterprises became involved and opened a branch in Chicago, followed by the 2005 opening in Las Vegas, NV.  These branches are known as "Joe's Seafood, Prime Steak and Stone Crab" to set them apart from the 4th generation owned Miami original.,

In 1998, they won an America’s Classic Award by the James Beard Foundation

Restaurant Business Magazine, the industry publication of record, reported in October 2014 that Joe's Stone Crab ranked second in the United States with $35.3 million in revenue in 2013. Only Tao Asian Bistro in Las Vegas ($64.6 million in revenues) ranked higher.

Popularity
Joe's Stone Crab is often visited by politicians, actors, and athletes.  It was featured in the 1985 film The Mean Season before its mid-1980s remodeling. The restaurant is reputedly referenced in Ian Fleming's novel "Goldfinger" as "Bill's on the Beach" in which James Bond ate the best meal he had ever eaten in his life. It was also in the comedy film "Big Trouble" starring Tim Allen. It was also mentioned in the film There's Something About Mary. The Golden Girls also mention it throughout the series. Joe's Stone Crab was also mentioned in a season 1 episode of The Golden Girls' spin-off, Empty Nest. It was also featured in Season 2, Episode 21 of the OC. It was also featured in Season 4, Episode 10 of "Billions". It was also mentioned in Season 1, Episode 2 of Nip/Tuck. It was mentioned again in Season 4, Episode 3 of Nip/Tuck. Joe's Stone Crab is the highest-grossing independent restaurant in the US, grossing $38.4 million in 2019.

See also
List of seafood restaurants
South Beach, Florida

References

External links
 

Restaurants in Miami
Seafood restaurants in Florida
Restaurants established in 1913
1913 establishments in Florida
James Beard Foundation Award winners